Scopula merina is a moth of the family Geometridae. It is found on Madagascar.

References

Moths described in 1956
merina
Moths of Africa